Mirror piece is a contemporary art installation created in 1965 by Michael Baldwin, a member of the British conceptual artists Art & Language.

Description 
Mirror piece is an installation of variable dimensions. It is composed of multiple mirrors of different sizes covered with regular or deforming glass plates, presented on wooden panels. This installation is accompanied by 13 pages of text and diagrams.

Exhibitions 

 Galerie Bruno Bischofberger, Männedorf, Switzerland
 Barcelona Museum of Contemporary Art,,.
 Château de MontsoreauMuseum of Contemporary Art, Montsoreau, France.

Critical analysis 
This installation, one of the first ones of the Art & Language collective, replaces the surface of a painting with mirrors. It allows us to discuss, among other things, the theme of representation as well as the place and role of the spectator in the work of art. The mirror, being a surface that reflects light without its own image, the artists will say of this gesture:

The mirror being in the place of what should be a painting, the spectator sees himself looking at a work of art and the recent practice of selfies has greatly contributed to the popularity of this Mirror Piece.

Bibliography 

 Matthew Jesse Jackson et Art & Language, Art & Language Reality (Dark) Fragments (Light) Philippe Méaille Collection, Château de Montsoreau-musée d'Art contemporain, 2018 
 Art & Language, Carles Guerra, Matthew Jesse Jackson, Bartomeu Marí, Philippe Méaille, Art & Language Uncompleted. The Phillipe Méaille Collection, Musée d'art contemporain de Barcelone, 2014,

References 

Installation art
Art & Language